Kaleybar (also Romanized as Kaleybar) is a village in Yeylaq Rural District, in the Central District of Kaleybar County, East Azerbaijan Province, Iran. At the 2006 census, its population was 17, in 6 families.

References 

Populated places in Kaleybar County